George William Pyke (2 March 1887 – 31 March 1960) was an Australian rules footballer who played with Fitzroy in the Victorian Football League (VFL).

Family
The son of Robert George Pyke (1853-1929), and Ellen Bryson Pyke (-1943), née Kerchar, later Mrs. Samuel Bilston, George William Pyke was born at Ararat, Victoria on 2 March 1887.

He married Eleanor Grace Turner (1887-1960) in 1910.

Notes

References

External links 

1887 births
1960 deaths
Australian rules footballers from Victoria (Australia)
Fitzroy Football Club players
People from Ararat, Victoria